Route 35 is a bus route operated by the Southeastern Pennsylvania Transportation Authority (SEPTA) in Philadelphia, Pennsylvania, United States.

Route description
Starting at the Wissahickon Transportation Center, the route travels west on Main Street, then follows a large clockwise loop via Umbria Street, Ridge Avenue, Roxborough Avenue, Manayunk Avenue and Leverington Avenue back to Main and thence to its start.

History

Streetcar service
The first Route 35 was a streetcar line that ran between West Philadelphia and Fairmount Park via 49th Street, 52nd Street, and Parkside Avenue. It was replaced by Routes 38A and 70 in 1929.

Bus service
Originally designated Route Z, service began on December 13, 1931, replacing the Chestnut Hill–Norristown Railway Company's trolley service on Main Street between Ridge Avenue and Levering Street in Roxborough. On February 1, 1942 the route was extended three miles east to Erie station on the Broad Street Line. On June 18, 1961, this extension was cut back to Wissahickon Loop. Two years later, on April 14, 1963, Route 35 was restructured as the "Roxborough-Manayunk Loop", running in a clockwise loop between Ridge Avenue & Fountain Street and Main Street & Green Lane. On October 8, 1967, Route Z was renumbered Route 35.

After being a circular service for over twenty years, on June 7, 1998, the 35 returned to Wissahickon Loop. On September 1, 2002, Route 35 was extended into Andorra, allowing more service in this neighborhood to be provided by smaller buses. (See Route 9.) Between November 12, 2006, and June 19, 2011, the route was renamed the Manayunk Roxborough Loop and once more withdrawn from Wissahickon Loop. From June 19, 2011, the route returned to Wissahickon which remains – in rebuilt form as the Wissahickon Transportation Center – the route's terminus.

References

External links

35
Transportation in Philadelphia